Platymaia rebierei is a species of crab in the family  Inachidae.

References

Majoidea
Crustaceans described in 1986